Kilian Geraci (born 25 March 1999) is a French professional rugby union player. He currently plays at lock for Lyon in the Top 14.

Honours

International 
 France (U20)
World Rugby Under 20 Championship winners (2): 2018, 2019

References

External links
France profile at FFR
 Lyon OU profile

Living people
1999 births
French rugby union players
Rugby union locks
Lyon OU players
France international rugby union players
FC Grenoble players
Sportspeople from Grenoble
21st-century French people